Mordellistena hoosieri is a beetle in the genus Mordellistena of the family Mordellidae. It was described in 1910 by Blatchley.

References

hoosieri
Beetles described in 1910